The Lackawanna Heritage Valley National and State Heritage Area is a state and federally designated National Heritage Area in northeastern Pennsylvania.  It was initially established in 1991 as the first State Heritage Park in Pennsylvania, and was additionally designated a National Heritage Area in 2000. The designations recognize the area's heritage of industry, architecture, history and natural resources, and provide a framework for development and promotion of these features. The Lackawanna Heritage Valley National and State Heritage Area is managed by the Lackawanna Heritage Valley Authority, or LHVA. 

The National Heritage Area comprises the Lackawanna River watershed as it descends through Carbondale and Scranton to its junction with the Susquehanna River at Pittston. The heritage area covers portions of Lackawanna, Susquehanna, Wayne and Luzerne counties. The area is strongly identified with anthracite coal mining and the industries which depended on the coal, such as railroading, locomotive-building and rail-making.

Major components of the heritage area include Steamtown National Historic Site, the Pennsylvania Anthracite Heritage Museum and the Electric City Trolley Museum.

References

External links
 

Protected areas established in 1991
1991 establishments in Pennsylvania
Protected areas of Lackawanna County, Pennsylvania
Protected areas of Susquehanna County, Pennsylvania
Lackawanna Heritage Valley
Protected areas of Wayne County, Pennsylvania
Protected areas of Luzerne County, Pennsylvania
National Heritage Areas of the United States